I'll Do Anything is a 1994 American comedy-drama film written and directed by James L. Brooks. While a large part of the film is a satire of the film industry, it also skewers relationships from various angles. Its primary plot concerns a down-on-his-luck actor who suddenly finds himself the sole caretaker of his six-year-old daughter.

Plot
In 1980, on the night he fails to win an Emmy Award, Matt Hobbs proposes to his longtime girlfriend Beth. He says the only thing holding him back is his dedication to his career, one which may not always work out, and Beth says that's one of the things she loves most about him. Seven years later, with a baby crying and no job for Matt, Beth is overflowing with resentment. By 1993, the pair have been divorced for several years and are living on opposite coasts. Matt auditions for a role in pompous, self-absorbed, and clueless film producer Burke Adler's new project but fails to get the part. He does however agree to chauffeur Adler occasionally. Matt flies to Georgia to pick up his daughter Jeannie for what he believes is a brief visit and discovers Beth is facing a prison term and Jeannie will be living with him for the duration of her sentence. The two return to Hollywood and struggle with their new circumstances and building a relationship (Matt hasn't seen the six-year-old since she was four).  When Matt goes in to make a screen test for a lead in a film, he leaves Jeannie with a friend at the studio, and when he picks her up he's stunned to learn she's been cast in a sitcom. There are multiple sub-plots, including one focusing on Matt's relationship with staff script-reader Cathy Breslow and another concerning test screening analyst Nan Mulhanney and her tumultuous relationship with Adler.

Cast

Production
Originally I'll Do Anything was conceived and filmed by James L. Brooks as an old-fashioned movie musical and parody of "Hollywood lifestyles and movie clichés", costing $40 million. It featured songs by Carole King, Prince, and Sinéad O'Connor, among others, with choreography by Twyla Tharp. When preview audience reactions to the music were overwhelmingly negative, all production numbers from the film were cut and Brooks wrote several new scenes, filming them over three days and spent seven weeks editing the film. Brooks noted: "Something like this not only tries one's soul - it threatens one's soul."
He later said of the film,

Reception
I'll Do Anything received mixed to positive reviews from critics. It currently holds a rating of 61% on Rotten Tomatoes based on 18 reviews.

In his three-star review in the Chicago Sun-Times, Roger Ebert called it "one of those offcenter comedies that gets its best moments simply by looking at people and seeing how funny, how pathetic, how wonderful they sometimes can be . . . it's a bright, edgy, funny story about people who have all the talent they need, but not all the luck . . . It is helpful, I think, to simply forget about the missing songs, and recognize that I'll Do Anything is a complete movie without them - smart, original, subversive." Janet Maslin of The New York Times described it as "droll" and "improbably buoyant."

Audiences surveyed by CinemaScore gave the film a grade "B−" on scale of A to F.

Box office
The film was a box office failure. Produced on a budget of $40 million, I'll Do Anything grossed only a little over $10.4 million, making it one of the worst performing films of the year when compared to its cost.

Year-end lists 
 Top 10 runner-ups (not ranked) – Janet Maslin, The New York Times
 Honorable mention – Jeff Simon, The Buffalo News
7th worsts – Glenn Lovell, San Jose Mercury News

Music
One of the original songs meant to be performed in the film is heard during the closing credits and is included on the soundtrack album released by Varèse Sarabande, along with four instrumental tracks by the film's composer, Hans Zimmer. While other versions of songs penned by  Prince resurfaced on some of his later projects, Girl 6 and The Vault: Old Friends 4 Sale, none of the actual performances from the movie were ever officially released.

Although James L. Brooks has mentioned he would like to release a director's cut restoring the musical numbers and including a making-of documentary, that project has yet to come to fruition. The film's commercially released version is available on DVD.

In a 2013 interview, Zimmer said that a release of the musical version is unlikely: "The deal structure on those songs was so complicated and so expensive, and it would cost so much money in rights to put it out.”

In an interview on Off Camera with Sam Jones, Jackson Browne stated that his song "I'll Do Anything", released on the 1993 album I'm Alive was originally written to be the title song for the movie. It was to be a comedic song sung by Albert Brooks where he is begging a test audience to favorably review his latest film.

References

External links
 
 
 
 
 "They Just Gotta Trust This Guy" - Los Angeles Times profile

1994 films
1994 comedy-drama films
American comedy-drama films
American satirical films
Columbia Pictures films
1990s English-language films
Films about actors
Films directed by James L. Brooks
Films produced by James L. Brooks
Gracie Films films
Films scored by Hans Zimmer
Films with screenplays by James L. Brooks
1990s satirical films
Films about father–daughter relationships
Films about parenting
1990s American films